36 China Town is a 2006 Indian Hindi-language mystery thriller comedy film directed by Abbas-Mustan and produced by Subhash Ghai. It is an official adaption of the 1992 American film Once Upon a Crime (which in turn is a remake of the 1960 Italian film Crimen).

The film stars an ensemble cast of Akshaye Khanna, Shahid Kapoor, Kareena Kapoor, Vivek Shauq, Isha Koppikar, Upen Patel (in his film debut), Paresh Rawal, Payal Rohatgi, Johnny Lever and Tannaz Irani (credited as Tanaaz Lal), while Priyanka Chopra and Tanushree Dutta make special appearances. The film follows the investigation of a police officer trying to find the killer of a wealthy casino owner, Sonia Chang.

Plot

The only child of Goa's China Town multimillionaire Sonia Chang has been kidnapped. To get her son, Vicky, back, she puts out a reward of over 25 lakh Rupees. She lives in her huge mansion named "36 China Town", with a servant couple Mr. Lobo and Mrs. Lobo in Goa. Sonia is consoled by Rocky, a local flirt.

The story then focuses upon Raj, a struggling actor and Priya, who ran away from home. They both meet each other after both of their dreams have been shattered. They find a child who appears to be all alone in Mumbai. They take pity on him, but after seeing a missing persons ad, they realise that the child is the son of Sonia Chang. Tempted by the reward money, they team up and decide to bring the child back home to his mom in Goa and cash in. Before leaving, they call Chang and tell her that they have her child. She was discussing the change in her will with her lawyer, Mr Dixit, when the duo inform her about her baby. Meanwhile, Raj starts falling in love with Priya.

Sonia is overjoyed and calls them to Goa. At midnight, her casino is hosting some interesting people. One of them is Mr. Natwar, a notorious gambler who has come along with his wife Gracy. Natwar has pawned his four hotels to Sonia and has only one hotel left in his possession. When he loses money, he is forced to pawn the last hotel too. He keeps this a secret, but Gracy knows the fact. Another person is KK, who has come along with his wife Ruby. There is Rocky also. Rocky flirts with Ruby. Even Natwar goes inside the mansion to meet Sonia and pawn the last hotel. Upset by this, Gracy goes to 36 China Town in an angry mood and then bedroom with Rocky. Meanwhile, KK and Natwar decide to play together and they lose all of their money.

Meanwhile, Raj and Priya come to Goa, where they run into a drunkard loitering near the mansion. The drunkard runs away on seeing them. On seeing the state of the house, they realise that Sonia has been robbed, but are later horrified to see Sonia dead. The duo run, but find that the child is left inside the mansion. Raj enters the mansion again to take him. He sees two eyes and legs of the killer behind a cupboard. Terrified, he gets out of the mansion with the child. Raj and Priya then inform Goa police about the murder. They keep the child inside a police van and run away. But Priya finds that she has left her suitcase inside the mansion inside which her passport is kept. Meanwhile, audience watch that Sonia's body is kept inside Priya's suitcase by somebody and kept outside the mansion. KK reaches the mansion and finds the suitcase. Thinking that it is containing lot of money, he takes it and reaches his room in hotel where Ruby is waiting for him. Meanwhile, Raj and Priya go back to the mansion to take her suitcase. Raj enters the mansion, but is arrested by Inspector Karan, the investigating officer and Ravi. Raj refuses to name Priya and it warms her heart as she watches on. Meanwhile, KK and Ruby find out that the suitcase contains a dead body, not money. They decide to dispose of the suitcase. Meanwhile, Priya takes Vicky to a church to drop him off but is seen by Rocky with the kid. As it was on the news to inform cops about a young girl with a kid, Rocky calls the police. Priya, who had wanted to help Raj, instead gets arrested and sent to jail. Priya and Raj become the prime suspects of the murder. Inside the jail, both fall for each other.

Meanwhile, KK and Ruby unable to dispose of the suitcase, are arrested by police. KK tells the truth to Karan about Natwar. Karan goes to meet Natwar. Natwar lies to him that he was in his room with his wife, Gracy. Karan goes away. Natwar then finds out that Gracy was with Rocky in the room. Next day, Karan comes to meet Natwar and Gracy. Natwar tells him that it was he who was in the room and he got out from a pipe directly to the neighboring house's bedroom (Which actually Rocky did). But to his shock, the room turns to be Sonia Chang's mansion's bedroom where she was murdered. Natwar is arrested.
 
Natwar then tells the truth to Karan about Rocky. Karan calls Rocky to the police station. But seeing Rocky's eyes, Raj recollects that it was Rocky's eyes and shoes which he had seen behind the cupboard. Rocky then tells that he was in Gracy's room that night. He had got out from the pipe to Sonia's bedroom only to find her already murdered. When he was about to get out from the house, Raj and Priya had entered with the child and started searching for Sonia. Then, when Raj had entered the mansion again to take the child, he had seen his (Rocky's) eyes and legs. Karan is able to reconstruct what actually happened that night. Based on Mr. Dixit's statement about the will and everybody's statement, Karan is able to find out the truth. First, he procures the drunkard, whom Raj and Priya believe to be the murderer. But, Karan goes on to explain that he is in fact, the kidnapper.

Karan goes on to explain that the kidnapper was hired by the killer but the kidnapper lost the baby, who was then found by Raj and Priya in Mumbai. After Sonia is informed by Raj and Priya about the baby's discovery, the mastermind found that his/her plan was failing. Hence, he/she murdered Sonia, while other people incriminated themselves by fooling others to believe that it was a robbery gone wrong. The actual killer was Mr. and Mrs. Lobo, Sonia's servants. According to Sonia Chang's initial will, after her death, the person who was most close to her son (which were her servants) would inherit everything but then one day she found out about their evil intentions and decided to change her will, which led to them murdering her.

The movie ends with all the characters laughing at a pub, enjoying dinner together.

Cast
Akshaye Khanna as Chief Inspector Karan 
Kareena Kapoor as Priya Singhania
Shahid Kapoor as Raj Malhotra
Paresh Rawal as Natwar
Payal Rohatgi as Gracy, Natwar's wife
Johnny Lever as KK
Tannaz Irani as Ruby, KK's wife
Upen Patel as Rocky
Dinyar Contractor as Mr. Lobo
Roshan Tirandaaz as Mrs. Lobo
Raj Zutshi as Drunkard / Contract Killer
Vivek Vaswani as Mr. Dixit, Lawyer
Vivek Shauq as Inspector Ravi
Isha Koppikar as Sonia Chang
Priyanka Chopra as Seema, Karan's wife. (special appearance)
Tanushree Dutta as Dancer in song Jab Kabhi. (special appearance)
Sambhavna Seth as Simran, Rocky's girlfriend.
Preeti Puri as Rosy
Nassar Abdullah as Raj's father

Awards and nominations
Winner
 IIFA Awards for Best Debutant (Male) – Upen Patel
 Zee Cine Award for Best Male Debut  – Upen Patel
 Global Indian Film Awards for Best Debut Actor  – Upen Patel

Nominated
 Filmfare Award for Best Female Playback Singer – Sunidhi Chauhan for "Aashiqui Mein Teri"
 Star Screen Award for Most Promising Newcomer (Male) – Upen Patel

Soundtrack

The music was composed by Himesh Reshammiya. Lyrics were penned by Sameer. The music was released by Tips Music. According to the Indian trade website Box Office India, with around 12,00,000 units sold, this film's soundtrack album was the year's ninth highest-selling.

The song "Aashiqui Mein Teri" was remade as "Aashiqui Mein Teri 2.0" for Reshammiya's 2020 film Happy Hardy and Heer and is performed by Reshammiya and singer Ranu Mondal.

Track listing

=

References

External links
 
 
 
 

2006 films
Indian detective films
Films directed by Abbas–Mustan
Films shot in the United Arab Emirates
2000s Hindi-language films
Films scored by Himesh Reshammiya
2000s comedy mystery films
2000s comedy thriller films
2000s mystery thriller films
Indian mystery thriller films
Indian remakes of Italian films
Indian comedy thriller films
Indian comedy mystery films
2006 comedy films
Films based on works by Luciano Vincenzoni